Christian Casimir Brittinger (30 April 1795, Friedberg – 11 January 1869, Steyr) was a German  botanist, entomologist and ornithologist.

Works

Botany 
 Die Pflanzen der Welserhaide bei Linz, nebst Beschreibung der Polygala Moriana (Regensburger botanische Zeitung 1825.)
 Beschreibung einer Excursion auf das Wascheneck bei Spital am Pyhrn in Ober-Oesterreich. (Regensburger botanische Zeitung 1832.)
 Topographie einiger Gewächse des Traunkreises. (Regensburger botanische Zeitung 1833.)
 Botanische Notizen. (Regensburger botanische Zeitung 1841.)
 Kritische Beurtheilung yon F. Sailer's Flora yon Ober-Oesterreich. (Regensburger botanische Zeitung 1842.)
 Bemerkungen zu einer von F. Sailer neu aufgestellten Gattung aus den Gentianeen. (Musealblatt von Linz.)
 Bericht über eine von F. Sailer neu aufgestellte Gattung Danubiunculus acaulis (Botanisches Centralblatt von Dr. Rabenhorst 1846.)
 Beobachtungen über einigen Pflanzen der Flora Steyr's. (Regensburger botanische Zeitung 1859.)
 Botanische Reise auf den Pyhrgas. (Medizinische Jahrbücher des k.k. österreichischen Staates. B. 13.)

Entomology 
 Die Schmetterlinge des Kronlandes Oesterreich ob der Enns. Wien, Braumüller, 1851
 Die Libelluliden des Kaiserreichs Österreich. S. B. Acad. Wiss. Wien 4, Mathem.-nat. Klasse:328-336.1850

References 

 Gallerie österreichischer Botaniker. III. Christian Brittinger. In: Plant Systematics and Evolution. 10/Juli 1860, Nr. 7, 1860, S. 209-213 (PDF; 519 kB).

German lepidopterists
1795 births
1869 deaths
German ornithologists
19th-century German botanists
19th-century German zoologists